To Tau Wan is a bay and a village in Wu Kai Sha, Sha Tin District, Hong Kong.

External links

 Delineation of area of existing village To Tau Wan (Sha Tin) for election of resident representative (2019 to 2022)

Bays of Hong Kong
Populated coastal places in Hong Kong
Wu Kai Sha
Villages in Sha Tin District, Hong Kong